This is a list of 134 species in Neolasioptera, a genus of gall midges in the family Cecidomyiidae.

Neolasioptera species

 Neolasioptera aeschynomensis Br Fthes, 1918 c g
 Neolasioptera albipes Felt, 1918 i c g
 Neolasioptera albitarsis (Felt, 1907) i c g
 Neolasioptera albolineata Felt, 1908 i c g
 Neolasioptera allioniae (Felt, 1911) i c g b
 Neolasioptera amaranthi Mohn, 1964 c g
 Neolasioptera ambrosiae Felt, 1909 i c g
 Neolasioptera angelicae (Beutenmuller, 1908) i c g
 Neolasioptera aphelandrae Mohn, 1964 c g
 Neolasioptera apocyni (Felt, 1921) i c g
 Neolasioptera argentata Brèthes, 1917 c g
 Neolasioptera argentisquama (Felt, 1908) i c g
 Neolasioptera asclepiae Felt, 1908 i c g
 Neolasioptera baccharicola Gagne, 1971 i c g
 Neolasioptera baezi Brèthes, 1922 c g
 Neolasioptera boehmeriae (Beutenmuller, 1908) i c g b
 Neolasioptera borreriae Mohn, 1964 c g
 Neolasioptera brevis Gagne, 1984 i c g
 Neolasioptera brickelliae Mohn, 1964 c g
 Neolasioptera caleae Mohn, 1964 c g
 Neolasioptera camarae Mohn, 1964 c g
 Neolasioptera capsici Mohn, 1964 c g
 Neolasioptera cassiae (Felt, 1909) i c g
 Neolasioptera caulicola (Felt, 1907) i c g
 Neolasioptera celastri Felt, 1908 i c g
 Neolasioptera celtis Mohn, 1964 c g
 Neolasioptera cestri Mohn, 1964 c g
 Neolasioptera cimmaronensis Mohn, 1975 c g
 Neolasioptera cinerea (Felt, 1907) i c g
 Neolasioptera cissampeli Mohn, 1964 c g
 Neolasioptera clematicola Mohn, 1964 c g
 Neolasioptera clematidis (Felt, 1907) i c g b
 Neolasioptera combreti Mohn, 1964 c g
 Neolasioptera compositarum Mohn, 1964 c g
 Neolasioptera compostarum Mohn, 1964 c g
 Neolasioptera convolvuli (Felt, 1907) i c g b
 Neolasioptera cordiae Mohn, 1964 c g
 Neolasioptera cornicola (Beutenmuller, 1907) i c g b
 Neolasioptera crotalariae (Stebbins, 1910) i c g
 Neolasioptera cruttwellae Gagne, 1977 c g
 Neolasioptera cuphae Gagne, 1998 c g
 Neolasioptera cupheae Gagne, 1998 c g
 Neolasioptera cusani Wunsch, 1979 c g
 Neolasioptera dentata Mohn, 1964 c g
 Neolasioptera desmodii (Felt, 1907) i c g b
 Neolasioptera diclipterae Wunsch, 1979 c g
 Neolasioptera diplaci (Felt, 1912) i c g
 Neolasioptera donamae Wunsch, 1979 c g
 Neolasioptera eregeroni (Brodie, 1894) i c g
 Neolasioptera erigeroni Brodie, 1894 c g
 Neolasioptera erigerontis (Felt, 1907) i c
 Neolasioptera erythroxyli Mohn, 1964 c g
 Neolasioptera eugeniae Maia, 1993 c g
 Neolasioptera eupatoriflorae (Felt, 1907) i c g
 Neolasioptera eupatorii (Felt, 1907) i c g b
 Neolasioptera exeupatorii Gagne, 1994 c g
 Neolasioptera exigua Mohn, 1964 c g
 Neolasioptera fariae (Tavares, 1922) c g
 Neolasioptera farinosa (Osten Sacken, 1862) i c g b
 Neolasioptera ferrata Mohn, 1964 c g
 Neolasioptera flavomaculata Felt, 1908 i c g
 Neolasioptera fontagrensis Gagne i c g
 Neolasioptera fraxinifolia (Felt, 1908) i c g
 Neolasioptera frugivora Gagne, 1977 c g
 Neolasioptera galeopsidis (Felt, 1909) i c g
 Neolasioptera grandis Mohn, 1964 c g
 Neolasioptera hamamelidis (Felt, 1907) i c g
 Neolasioptera helianthi (Felt, 1907) i c g
 Neolasioptera heliocarpi Mohn, 1964 c g
 Neolasioptera hibisci (Felt, 1907) i c g
 Neolasioptera hirsuta Felt, 1908 i c g
 Neolasioptera hyptis Mohn, 1964 c g
 Neolasioptera impatientifolia (Felt, 1907) i c g b
 Neolasioptera incisa Plakidas, 1994 c g b
 Neolasioptera indigoferae Mohn, 1964 c g
 Neolasioptera ingae Mohn, 1964 c g
 Neolasioptera iresinis Mohn, 1964 c g
 Neolasioptera lantanae (Tavares, 1922) c g
 Neolasioptera lapalmae Mohn, 1964 c g
 Neolasioptera lathami Gagne, 1971 i c g
 Neolasioptera linderae (Beutenmuller, 1907) i c g
 Neolasioptera lupini (Felt, 1908) i c g
 Neolasioptera lycopi (Felt, 1907) i c g b
 Neolasioptera major Felt, 1918 i c g
 Neolasioptera malvavisci Mohn, 1975 c g
 Neolasioptera martelli Nijveldt, 1967 i c g
 Neolasioptera melantherae Mohn, 1964 c g
 Neolasioptera menthae Felt, 1909 i c g
 Neolasioptera merremiae Mohn, 1964 c g
 Neolasioptera mimuli Felt, 1908 i c g
 Neolasioptera mincae Wunsch, 1979 c g
 Neolasioptera mitchellae (Felt, 1908) i c g
 Neolasioptera monardi (Brodie, 1894) i c g b
 Neolasioptera murtfeldtiana  i g
 Neolasioptera neofusca (Felt, 1908) i c g
 Neolasioptera nodulosa (Beutenmuller, 1907) i c g b  (nodular stem gall midge)
 Neolasioptera odontonemae Mohn, 1964 c g
 Neolasioptera olivae Wunsch, 1979 c g
 Neolasioptera palmeri (Felt, 1925) i c g
 Neolasioptera palustris (Felt, 1907) i c g
 Neolasioptera parvula Mohn, 1964 c g
 Neolasioptera perfoliata (Felt, 1907) i c g b
 Neolasioptera phaseoli Mohn, 1975 c g
 Neolasioptera pierrei Gagne, 1972 i c g
 Neolasioptera portulacae (Cook, 1906) i
 Neolasioptera potentillaecaulis (Stebbins, 1910) i g
 Neolasioptera psederae (Felt, 1934) i
 Neolasioptera pseudocalymmae Mohn, 1964 c g
 Neolasioptera punicei (Brodie, 1909) i c g
 Neolasioptera quercina (Felt, 1907) i c g
 Neolasioptera ramuscula (Beutenmuller, 1907) i c g
 Neolasioptera riparia (Felt, 1909) c g
 Neolasioptera rostrata Gagne, 1989 i c g
 Neolasioptera rudbeckiae (Felt, 1908) i c g
 Neolasioptera salvadorensis Mohn, 1964 c g
 Neolasioptera salviae Mohn, 1964 c g
 Neolasioptera samariae Wunsch, 1979 c g
 Neolasioptera senecionis Mohn, 1964 c g
 Neolasioptera serrata Mohn, 1964 c g
 Neolasioptera sidae Mohn, 1964 c g
 Neolasioptera spinulae (Felt, 1908) i c g
 Neolasioptera tertia (Cockerell, 1898) i c g
 Neolasioptera thurstoni (Brodie, 1894) i c g
 Neolasioptera tournefortiae Mohn, 1964 c g
 Neolasioptera triadenii (Beutenmuller, 1908) i c g
 Neolasioptera tribulae Wunsch, 1979 c g
 Neolasioptera variipalpus (Mani, 1937) c g
 Neolasioptera verbenae (Feltm, 1912) i c g
 Neolasioptera verbesinae Mohn, 1964 c g
 Neolasioptera vernoniae (Beutenmuller, 1907) i c g b
 Neolasioptera vernoniensis Mohn, 1964 c g
 Neolasioptera viburnicola (Beutenmuller, 1907) i c g
 Neolasioptera vitinea (Felt, 1907) i c g b
 Neolasioptera willistoni (Cockerell, 1898) i c g b

Data sources: i = ITIS, c = Catalogue of Life, g = GBIF, b = Bugguide.net

References